The United Nations Environment Programme (UNEP) established Champions of the Earth in 2005 as an annual awards programme to recognize outstanding environmental leaders from the public and private sectors, and from civil society.

Award details 
Typically, five to seven laureates are selected annually. Each laureate is invited to an award ceremony to receive a trophy, give an acceptance speech and take part in a press conference. No financial awards are conferred. This awards programme is a successor to UNEP's Global 500 Roll of Honour.

The prize includes $15,000 of financial support.

In 2017, the program was expanded to include Young Champions of the Earth – a forward-looking prize for talented innovators, 18 to 30, who demonstrate outstanding potential to create positive environmental impact. The initiative is run in partnership with the Covestro, a plastics company. It is awarded every year by UNEP to seven young environmentalists from around the world between the ages of 18 and 30, for their outstanding ideas to protect the environment.

Awardees: Champions of the Earth

2021 

 Prime Minister Mia Mottley (Barbados) - Policy Leadership
 Dr. Gladys Kalema-Zikusoka (Uganda) - Science and Innovation
 Maria Kolesnikova (Kyrgyz Republic) - Entrepreneurial Vision
 Sea Women of Melanesia (Papua New Guinea and the Soloman Islands) - Inspiration and Action
 David Attenborough - Lifetime Achievement Award

2020 

 Prime Minister Frank Bainimarama (Fiji) - Policy Leadership
 Dr. Fabian Leendertz (Germany) - Science and Innovation
 Mindy Lubber (United States) - Entrepreneurial Vision
 Nemonte Nenquimo (Ecuador) - Inspiration and Action
 Yacouba Sawadogo (Burkina Faso)- Inspiration and Action
 Professor Robert D. Bullard (United States)- Lifetime Achievement Award

2019 

 Costa Rica - Policy Leadership
Katharine Hayhoe - Science and Innovation
Ant Forest - Inspiration and Action
Fridays For Future - Inspiration and Action
Patagonia - Entrepreneurial Vision
Louise Mabulo - Environmental conservation

2018 

 Cochin International Airport - Entrepreneurial Vision
 Emmanuel Macron - Policy Leadership
 Beyond Meat - Science and Innovation
 Impossible Foods - Science and Innovation
 Joan Carling - Lifetime Achievement Award
 Narendra Modi - Policy Leadership
 Zhejiang’s Green Rural Revival Programme - Inspiration and Action

2017 

 Paul A. Newman & NASA's Goddard Space Flight Center - Science and Innovation
 Mobike - Entrepreneurial Vision
 Jeff Orlowski - Inspiration and Action
 Saihanba National Forest Park - Inspiration and Action
 Christopher I'Anson - General Champion
 Wang Wenbiao - Lifetime Achievement Award

2016 
 Afroz Shah - Inspiration and Action
 Berta Cáceres - Inspiration and Action
 José Sarukhán Kermez - Lifetime Achievement
 Leyla Acaroglu - Science and Innovation
 The Moroccan Agency for Solar Energy (MASEN) - Entrepreneurial Vision
 Paul Kagame - Policy Leadership

2015 
 Prime minister Sheikh Hasina, Bangladesh - Policy Leadership
 Black Mamba APU - Inspiration & Action
 The National Geographic Society - Science & Innovation
 Natura Brasil - Entrepreneurial Vision
 Paul Polman - Entrepreneurial Vision

2014

 Boyan Slat - Inspiration and Action
 Fatima Jibrell, Somalia - Environmental conservation
 Susilo Bambang Yudhoyono - Policy Leadership
 Tommy Remengesau, Jr - Policy Leadership
 Mario José Molina-Pasquel Henríquez - Lifetime Leadership
 Robert Watson - Science and Innovation
 Sylvia Earle - Lifetime Leadership
 U.S. Green Building Council - Entrepreneurial Vision

2013 
 Janez Potočnik - Policy Leadership
 Brian McClendon -  Entrepreneurial Vision
 Carlo Petrini - Inspiration and Action
 Izabella Teixeira - Policy Leadership
 Jack Dangermond - Entrepreneurial Vision
 Martha Isabel Ruiz Corzo - Inspiration and Action
 Veerabhadran Ramanathan - Science and Innovation

2012
 President Tsakhiagiin Elbegdorj, Mongolia - Policy Leadership category
 Fabio Coletti Barbosa, Brazil (CEO of Grupo Abril) and Dr Sultan Ahmed al Jaber, United Arab Emirates (CEO of Masdar)- Entrepreneurial Vision category
 Bertrand Piccard, Switzerland - Inspiration and Action category
 Sander Van Der Leeuw, Netherlands - Science and Innovation category
 Samson Parashina, Kenya - Special Category for Grassroots Initiatives

2011
 President Felipe Calderón, Mexico - Policy Leadership Category
 Dr. Olga Speranskaya, Russia - Science & Innovation Category
 Zhang Yue, Broad Group, China - Entrepreneurial Vision Category
 Louis Palmer, Switzerland - Inspiration & Action Category [co-winner]
 Angélique Kidjo, Benin - Inspiration & Action Category co-winner

2010
 President Mohamed Nasheed, Maldives - Policy Leadership Category
 Taro Takahashi, Japan - Science & Innovation Category
 Vinod Khosla, India - Entrepreneurial Vision Category
 Prince Mostapha Zaher, Afghanistan - Inspiration & Action Category [co-winner]
 Zhou Xun, China - Inspiration & Action Category co-winner

Special Award
 President Bharrat Jagdeo, Guyana - For Biodiversity Conservation & Ecosystem Management

2009
 Erik Solheim, Norway - Policy Leadership Category (co-winner)
 Kevin Conrad and the Coalition for Rainforest Nations, Papua New Guinea - Policy Leadership Category (co-winner)
 Janine Benyus, United States - Science & Innovation Category
 Ron Gonen, United States - Entrepreneurial Vision Category
 Tulsi Tanti, India - Entrepreneurial Vision  Category
 Yann Arthus-Bertrand, France - Inspiration & Action Category

2008
Balgis Osman-Elasha, Sudan from Africa - For her work on climate change and adaptation in northern and eastern Africa.
Atiq Rahman, Bangladesh from Asia and the Pacific - For his national and international experience in sustainable development, and environment and resource management. He is one of the leading specialists in the field.
Albert II, Prince of Monaco, Monaco from Europe: For his commitment to sustainable development in Monaco. Under his leadership, Monaco is now applying an exemplary policy on CO2 reduction in every sphere of society as well as in the business sector.
Liz Thompson, Barbados, from Latin America and the Caribbean - For her outstanding work at the national and international levels. She is one of the recognized leaders on environmental issues of the Small Island Developing States (SIDS).
Timothy E. Wirth, United States from North America - For his work as the head of the UN Foundation and Better World Fund, he established the environment as a priority and mobilized resources to address it.
Abdul-Qader Ba-Jammal, Yemen from West Asia: For his environmental policies as Minister and then as Prime Minister in Yemen. He established its Ministry of Water and Environment and the Environment Protection Authority.

Special Prize
Helen Clark, New Zealand - For her environmental strategies and her three initiatives - the emissions trading scheme, the energy strategy and the energy efficiency and conservation strategy.

2007
 Cherif Rahmani, Algeria from Africa - For advancing environmental law in Algeria and for addressing the issue of desertification;
 Elisea "Bebet" Gillera Gozun, Philippines from Asia and the Pacific - for pushing forward the environmental agenda in her native Philippines by winning the trust of business leaders, non-governmental organizations and political decision-makers alike;
 Viveka Bohn, Sweden from Europe:  for playing a prominent role in multilateral negotiations and her leadership in global efforts to ensure chemical safety;
 Marina Silva, Brazil from Latin America and the Caribbean - For her tireless fight to protect the Amazon rainforest while taking into account the perspectives of people who use the resources in their daily lives;
 Al Gore, United States from North America - For making environmental protection a pillar of his public service and for educating the world on the dangers posed by rising greenhouse gas emissions;
 His Royal Highness Prince Hassan Bin Talal, Jordan from West Asia - For his belief in transboundary collaboration to protect the environment and for addressing environmental issues in a holistic manner;

Special Prize
 Jacques Rogge and the International Olympic Committee (IOC) - For advancing the sport and environment agenda by providing greater resources to sustainable development and for introducing stringent environmental requirements for cities bidding to host Olympic Games

2006
 Rosa Elena Simeon Negrin, Cuba
 Women's Environment & Development Organization
 Tewolde Berhan Gebre Egziabher, Ethiopia
 Masoumeh Ebtekar, Iran
 Mohamed El-Ashry, Egypt
 Tommy Koh Thong Bee, Singapore
 Mikhail Gorbachev, Russia

2005
 King Jigme Singye Wangchuck and the people of Bhutan, Bhutan
 Sheikh Zayed bin Sultan Al Nahyan, United Arab Emirates
 Thabo Mbeki, South Africa
 Ecumenical Patriarch Bartholomew, Native Greek
 Sheila Watt-Cloutier, Canada
 Julia Carabias Lillo, Mexico
 Zhou Qiang and the All-China Youth Federation, China

Awardees: Young Champions of the Earth

2020 

 Xiaoyuan Ren, China.
 Vidyut Mohan, India.
 Nzambi Matee, Kenya.
 Niria Alicia Garcia, United States of America.
 Max Hidalgo Quinto, Peru.
 Lefteris Arapakis, Greece.
 Fatemah Alzelzela, Kuwait.

2019 

 Molly Burhans, United States of America.
Omar Itani, Lebanon.
Sonika Manandhar, Nepal.
Marianna Muntianu, Russia.
Louise Mabulo, Philippines.
Anna Luísa Beserra, Brazil.
 Adjany Costa, Angola.

2018 

 Shady Rabab, Egypt.
 Miranda Wang, United States of America.
 Miao Wang, China.
 Hugh Weldon, Ireland.
 Heba Al-Farra, Kuwait.
 Gator Halpern, Bahamas.
 Arpit Dhupar, India.

2017

Omer Badokhon, Yemen.
 Adam Dixon, Europe.
 Kaya Dorey, North America.
 Eritai Kateibwi, Earth for Asia & the Pacific
 Mariama Mamane, Niger.
 Liliana Jaramillo Pazmiño, Latin America & the Caribbean.

See also

 Heroes of the Environment
 Forest Hero Award
 List of environmental awards

References

External links
 Champions of the Earth, United Nations Environment Programme
Young Champions of the Earth, United Nations Environment Programme
 Database of all laureates at: 

Awards established in 2005
Environmental awards
United Nations Environment Programme
United Nations awards